The University San Gregorio de Portoviejo also known as USGP, is an autonomous institution with social and public purposes and can provide education, conduct research with scientific freedom - administrative, and participate in national development plans, grant, recognize and validate academic degrees and professional qualifications, and generally perform the activities to achieve its goals.

History 
The University of San Gregorio Portoviejo, located in the city of Portoviejo, capital of the province of Manabi was established by Legislative Decree # 2000-33, dated 14 December 2000 on the structure of the Secular University "Vicente Rocafuerte" of Guayaquil, Portoviejo extension, which began operating from May 20, 1968.

See also

List of universities in Ecuador

References 
History. Universidad San Gregorio de Portoviejo.

External links
 sangregorio.edu.ec, university's official website

Universities in Ecuador